Witold Kulik (born 4 August 1957) is a former Polish football player and manager, and current member of the Pruszcz Gdański council.

Football
Kulik played for Stoczniowiec Gdańsk during his professional career, and also managed Stoczniowiec, then known as Polonia Gdańsk, for the 1994-95 season. As manager he led Polonia to the III liga title, finishing 10 points clear of second place Elana Toruń with the team scoring 99 goals in the league. Decpite winning the league, Kulik was not kept as the manager for the following season. In 1998-99 Stanisław Stachura served as the manager of the Lechia Gdańsk first team. Stachura chose Kulik to be the second manager, they worked alongside each other as joint first team managers of Lechia for the 1998-99 season. After a disappointing season, both Kulik and Stachura lost their jobs.

After football
After football Kulik went into politics, and has been on the Pruszcz Gdański council since 2010. Kulik has been the owner of a goods shop called "Ewelina" in Pruszcz Gdański since 1995.

Honours

Polonia Gdańsk
III liga (Gdańsk group)
Winners: 1994-95

References

1957 births
Polish football managers
Polonia Gdańsk players
Lechia Gdańsk managers
Living people
Polish footballers
Association footballers not categorized by position